Mboki is a town and sub-prefecture in the Haut-Mbomou prefecture of the south-eastern Central African Republic.

History

LRA Insurgency 
On 24 July 2009, 13 LRA fighters commanded by Colonel Acellam Smart attacked Mboki. They looted properties in the town's market and killed five civilians. However, when they killed 11 years old boy, 200 Mboki self-defence force fighters attacked the militias with arrows and machetes. The traders managed to kill three and injure three LRA fighters. As a result, LRA retreated from the town and escaped to the bush. While hiding in the bush, three injured LRA fighters soon died.

On 20 and 21 March 2010, LRA attacked Mboki. They abducted six people and killed the chief of Mboki 3 neighborhood.

Central African Republic Civil War 
Until mid-2017 Mboki was not affected by Central African Republic Civil War. In June 2017 presence of Union for Peace in the Central African Republic (UPC) fighters and incursions by self-defense groups from Bangassou was reported in the town. On 25 June three soldiers were killed in Mboki. As of April 2021 Mboki remains under control of UPC armed group.

Transport
The town is served by M'Boki Airport.

References 

Sub-prefectures of the Central African Republic
Populated places in Haut-Mbomou